When a Woman Strikes is a 1919 silent film western drama directed by Roy Clements and starring Rosemary Theby and Ben F. Wilson. An independent production there is scarce info on this pictures. It is not known whether it survives or is lost.

Cast
 Rosemary Theby
 Ben F. Wilson
 Neva Gerber
 Murdock MacQuarrie

References

External links

 

1919 films
1919 Western (genre) films
American black-and-white films
Films directed by Roy Clements
Silent American Western (genre) films
1910s American films